Eve Tushnet (born 1978) is an American lesbian Roman Catholic author, blogger, and speaker. In addition to publishing books, she has a blog and writes regularly for several major magazines, among them The American Spectator, Commonweal, National Catholic Register, National Review, America Magazine, and The Washington Blade.

Background
Her father is Mark Tushnet, a professor at Harvard Law School. Her mother, Elizabeth Alexander, directs the National Prison Project of the American Civil Liberties Union. Her sister Rebecca Tushnet is also a professor at Harvard Law School.

Tushnet came out as a lesbian around the age of 13 or 14, and her family was supportive. She entered Yale University in 1996 as "a happy lesbian." Raised in a "secular Jewish" household, she converted to Catholicism in 1998 at the age of 19 during her sophomore year. After college, she joined the National Catholic Register. She was also a researcher at the Manhattan Institute for Policy Research, a conservative think tank. , she lives in the Dupont Circle neighborhood of Washington, DC.

Views
Tushnet is celibate due to the Catholic Church's teaching on sex outside of heterosexual marriage. She does not support same-sex marriage, having stated that marriage should be reserved for heterosexuals, whose "relationships can be either uniquely dangerous or uniquely fruitful. Thus it makes sense to have an institution dedicated to structuring and channeling them."

"I really think the most important thing is, I really like being gay and I really like being Catholic," she said in a 2010 interview with The New York Times. "If nobody ever calls me self-hating again, it will be too soon."

Major publications
 
 "A Story Like Mine", Lady Churchill's Rosebud Wristlet #24 (2009).
  Amends: A Novel (2015).
  Tenderness: A Gay Christian's Guide to Unlearning Rejection and Experiencing God's Extravagant Love (2021) ISBN 978-1646800742.

See also
 Catholic Church and homosexuality

References

External links
 Eve Tushnet's blog

1978 births
21st-century American non-fiction writers
21st-century American women writers
American bloggers
American lesbian writers
American people of Jewish descent
American Roman Catholic religious writers
American women bloggers
Catholics from Washington, D.C.
Converts to Roman Catholicism from Judaism
LGBT Roman Catholics
Living people
People from Dupont Circle
Place of birth missing (living people)